Fasser may refer to:

 Alexander Fasser (born 1975), Austrian ski mountaineer and mountain biker
 Ekkehard Fasser (1952–2021), Swiss bobsledder